Badister iranicus is a species of ground beetle in the genus Badister. It was discovered by Jedlicka in 1961 in Iran.

References

Harpalinae
Beetles described in 1961
Endemic fauna of Iran